Noel Christopher Fisher (born ), professionally known as Detail, is an American former record producer, singer and songwriter. Hailing from Detroit, Michigan, Detail is best known for producing several hit singles, including "Sexy Can I" by Ray J, "I'm So Paid" by Akon, "How to Love" by Lil Wayne, "Drunk in Love", "711" by Beyoncé, and "We Dem Boyz" by Wiz Khalifa. He released his debut studio album, Noel in December 2015.

Life and career 
In late 2005, he began to gain recognition in the music industry as a producer, after teaming up with American R&B singer Ray J to produce the bulk of his third album Raydiation. Since then he continued to produce tracks for Ray J, and expanded his catalog by working with other prominent artists such as Akon, the Pussycat Dolls, Lil Wayne, Beyoncé, Ashanti, Marques Houston, Lady Gaga, Brandy, Shorty Mack, Christina Aguilera, T-Pain, Jennifer Lopez, R. Kelly, Bone Thugs-n-Harmony, and Snoop Dogg.

Detail co-wrote and produced Lil Wayne's hit single "How to Love", for Wayne's 2011 album Tha Carter IV. The single was certified 4× Platinum by the Recording Industry Association of America (RIAA) and Detail subsequently signed to Wayne's Young Money Entertainment, as well as Cash Money Records, as a producer. Recently, he has produced the singles "Drunk In Love" for Beyoncé, "We Dem Boyz" for Wiz Khalifa and  "I Luh Ya Papi" for Jennifer Lopez.

Detail received his first Grammy, when "Drunk In Love", performed by Beyoncé and Jay-Z, won Best R&B Song during the 57th Annual Grammy Awards.

In June 2016, Detail sued Drake for allegedly having his bodyguard assault him. His jaw was broken. Anthony Katz, a PR rep for Detail stated the producer’s insurance company is planning on taking legal action. The producer planned to release an official statement. The statement was never released.

Sexual assault cases
In May 2018, two women named Kristina Buch and Peyton Ackley filed legal documents against Detail. Their allegations against him include multiple instances of mental and physical abuse and rape. The two women have since been granted restraining orders against him. The singer Jessie Reyez also revealed that her song Gatekeeper is about him.

Several other women have since joined Buch, Ackley, and Reyez in coming forward with similar allegations, including Bebe Rexha and Tinashe.

He was arrested on August 5, 2020 by the Los Angeles County Sheriff's Department and charged with raping five women and sexually assaulting another.

Currently, he is being held on bail of $6.3 million. Detail was arrested for incidents that took place between 2010 and 2018. Earlier, in 2011 he was accused of sexual assault and accused of holding a woman against her will and sexually assaulting her following a pre-Grammy party at his home in Canyon Country, California.

According to the source, the woman was a catering assistant and was hired to provide food for the party. TMZ reported that she said that after rebuffing Fisher's advances, he ripped off her clothes, locked her into a room and then raped her. She also stated that after she was able to escape Fisher, she told police and submitted to a rape kit.

Later, in 2018 another woman named Kristina Buch filed a lawsuit against Fisher alleging sexual assault. Buch, a model and aspiring singer, alleged that he raped her in Miami during a recording session and forced her to have sex in front of others. Furthermore, Peyton Ackley accused the music producer of forcing her to have sex with him in front of someone else and forcing her to record him having sex with Kristina. According to the Associated Press, Buch won her $15 million lawsuits in a default judgment because Fisher and his attorney did not respond to court summons or file any documents.

Discography

Studio albums

Compilation albums

Singles

As lead artist

As featured artist

Guest appearances

Production discography

Singles produced

Awards and nominations

Grammy Awards
The Grammy Award are presented annually by the National Academy of Recording Arts and Sciences of the United States for outstanding achievements in the music industry. The awards were established in 1958. Detail received his first Grammy, when Drunk in Love performed by Beyoncé & Jay-Z won best R&B song during the 57th Annual Grammy Awards.

|-
| rowspan=3| 2015 
| "We Dem Boyz"
| Best Rap Song 
|  
|-
| "Drunk in Love"
| Best R&B Song 
|  
|-
| Beyoncé (as producer)
| Album of the Year 
|

References

External links
 Hiphopnc.com
 Xxlmag.com
 Complex.com

1971 births
Date of birth missing (living people)
Place of birth missing (living people)
Living people
African-American record producers
American hip hop record producers
Cash Money Records artists
American hip hop singers
Midwest hip hop musicians
American male singer-songwriters
American pop musicians
American contemporary R&B singers
Young Money Entertainment artists
Republic Records artists
Singers from Detroit
21st-century American singers
21st-century American criminals
American prisoners and detainees
Prisoners and detainees of Michigan
People charged with rape
21st-century American male singers
21st-century African-American male singers
20th-century African-American people
Singer-songwriters from Michigan